Yuquan Subdistrict is a subdistrict in Jiyuan, Henan, China. , it administers the following 25 residential neighborhoods:
Yaqiao
Beiyantou
Xishuitun
Beishuitun
Nanshuitun
Gangtou
Ximatou
Zhongmatou
Dongmatou
Miaodian
Jiuhezhuang
Dongguo Road
Xiguo Road
Wangzhuang
Shiniu New Village
Baigou New Village
Liuzhuang New Village
Lujialing New Village
Zhuyu New Village
Duanzhuang
Nanyantou
Yaqiao Community
Quanshuiwan Community
Quanxing Community
Quanhui Community

See also 
 List of township-level divisions of Henan

References 

Township-level divisions of Henan
Jiyuan